Eri Hozumi and Makoto Ninomiya defeated Alicja Rosolska and Erin Routliffe in the final, 6–4, 6–7(5–7), [10–5] to win the doubles tennis title at the 2022 Bad Homburg Open.

Darija Jurak Schreiber and Andreja Klepač were the defending champions, but Jurak Schreiber was unable to participate due to injury and Klepač chose to play in Eastbourne instead.

Seeds

Draw

Draw

References

External links 
Main draw

Bad Homburg Open - Doubles